Krishnendu Adhikari (Bengali: কৃষ্ণেন্দু অধিকারী; born: 2 January 1982) is an Indian actor, director and producer who primarily works in Bengali theatre and the Bengali Film Industry. He co-founded the Kolkata-based performance collective Behala Project Prometheus in 2016. He is dedicated towards revitalizing political and movement-based theatre in India.

Biography 
Born in Tamluk, West Bengal, Adhikari is the youngest of three siblings. He completed his Bachelors in English literature from Midnapore College, West Bengal. In 2012, Adhikari began his creative journey as ensemble actor and professional photographer with the Rang Roop theatre group in Kolkata, India. Over the course of the next five years, he received intensive training in physical/vocal acting, body awareness and kinesthetics under the tutelage of Indian performance stalwarts Sima Mukhopadhyay and Vikram Iyengar. Adhikari also learned the Tamil martial art Kalaripayattu under the able guidance of Indian facilitator Arka Mukhopadhyay.

In 2016, Adhikari participated in the prestigious Bharat Rang Mahotsav theatre festival in Delhi, India, as actor and production manager in Rajar Mrityu (Bengali: রাজার মৃত্যু; directed by Sudipto Chatterjee) and Raajrokto (Bengali: রাজরক্ত, directed by Debasish Dutta). In the same year, Adhikari had his breakthrough moment as a theatre actor with two concurrent and widely appreciated Bengali productions - Ags'uddhi (Bengali: আগশুদ্ধি; adapted from the Arthur Miller play The Crucible; directed by Sudipto Chatterjee) and Indur O Manush (Bengali: ইঁদুর ও মানুষ; adapted from the John Steinbeck novel Of Mice and Men; directed by Debasis Biswas). Adhikari's portrayal of Chhotu Mandi (Bengali: ছোটু মান্ডি), the lead character in Ags'uddhi, received particular critical acclaim. Later, in 2018, Adhikari headlined a theatrical production titled Mrityusangbad (Bengali: মৃত্যুসংবাদ; a play by Mohit Chattopadhyay, directed by Partha Sarathi Raha). Having earned significant praise for his portrayal of the "Stranger", Adhikari and team travelled to Mysore, India with Mrityusangbad as part of the 20th Bharat Rang Mahotsav festival in 2019.

In 2016, Adhikari co-founded his own performance company - Behala Project Prometheus - with professional associate Indudipa Sinha, with an aim to rejuvenate and redefine creative expression in political and movement-based theatre in India. It was early 2017 when Adhikari and the company premiered their magnum opus Code Red - a theatre and dance presentation, adapted from Rabindranath Tagore's poem Sishutirtha (Bengali: শিশুতীর্থ ), and directed by Sinha. Adhikari served as ensemble member, production manager, and assistant director to this critically hailed production, which travelled nationally as part of the 8th Theatre Olympics in Bhopal, India (2018) and the fifth C.G.K. Rashtriya Rangothsava in Bengaluru, India (2018).

Adhikari had his directorial debut at the Short and Sweet theatre festival in Kolkata in 2015 with a ten-minute play titled One Two Three.

In 2016, Adhikari had his maiden silver screen venture as an actor in the critically acclaimed Bengali film Tope - The Bait, directed by Buddhadeb Dasgupta, which travelled to the Toronto International Film Festival, the 60th BFI London Film Festival, and the 21st Busan International Film Festival. In 2017, Adhikari had his debut in the commercial Bengali Film Industry as a supporting character in Birsa Dasgupta's One. Adhikari has also featured in independent Bengali short films, notable among which are Niruddesh/Adrift (Bengali: নিরুদ্দেশ; directed by Saptarshi Bhattacharya) and Banshi (Bengali: বাঁশি; directed by Kaushik Sengupta). In 2018, Niruddesh/Adrift, with Adikari in the lead, was selected and screened as part of the Hyderabad Bengali Film Festival in Hyderabad, India, the India Shorts Competition organised by the 9th Jagran Film Festival in Delhi, India, and an international screening organised by The Tannenbusch House in Bonn, Germany. In 2019, Niruddesh/Adrift was selected to be screened as part of the Second South Asian Short Film Festival in Kolkata, India.

Adhikari, along with Behala Project Prometheus, premiered a Bengali theatre production in 2018 titled Jara Jege Thake (Bengali: যারা জেগে থাকে), with allegorical references to the present political climate in West Bengal and India.

In 2019, Adhikari starred in the first installment of a Bengali web series titled The Senapatis as sub-inspector G. R. Neogi on the Indian web entertainment platform Addatimes.

Plays 
Anandamath (Bengali: আনন্দমঠ) [Lead performer], premiered in 2018
Jara Jege Thake (Bengali: যারা জেগে থাকে) [Lead performer and producer with Behala Project Prometheus, premiered in 2018
Mrityusangbad (Bengali: মৃত্যুসংবাদ) [Lead performer], premiered in 2018
Ekti Shohoj Khuner Golpo (Bengali: একটি সহজ খুনের গল্প) [Lead performer and producer with Behala Project Prometheus, premiered in 2017
Code Red [Ensemble/lead performer, production manager, and assistant director with Behala Project Prometheus, premiered in 2017
Indur O Manush (Bengali: ইঁদুর ও মানুষ) [Performer], premiered in 2016
Ags'uddhi (Bengali: আগশুদ্ধি) [Lead performer], premiered in 2016
Ordhek Jeebon (Bengali: অর্ধেক জীবন) [Lead performer and producer with Behala Project Prometheus, premiered in 2016
Page Four/4 [Lead performer], premiered in 2016
Rajar Mrityu (Bengali: রাজার মৃত্যু) [Performer and production manager], premiered in 2015
A Good Deed for Mr. Stinky [Lead performer], premiered in 2015
One Two Three [Director], premiered in 2015
Raajrokto (Bengali: রাজরক্ত) [Lead performer], premiered in 2014

Filmography 
Mon Matal (Bengali: মন মাতাল; Bangali feature film),[Performer], Expected Release 2023
Chipkali (Hindi:Hindi feature film)[Performer], Expected Release 2023
Goyenda Junior (Bengali: গোয়েন্দা জুনিয়ার; Bengali feature film) [Performer], premiered in 2019
Banshi (Bengali: বাঁশি; Bengali short film) [Performer], premiered in 2018
Niruddesh/Adrift (Bengali: নিরুদ্দেশ; Bengali short film) [Lead performer], premiered in 2018
One (Bengali feature film) [Performer], premiered in 2017
Tope (film) - The Bait (Bengali feature film) [Performer], premiered in 2016

 TV and Web Series 
 " The Senapatis" - Volume 2 ( Bengali web series)The Senapatis - Volume 1 (Bengali web series) [Performer], premiered in 2019

 References 

 External links 
 "AAGSHUDDHI: A relevant readaptation of Miller’s 1953 classic". www.kaahon.com. https://www.kaahon.com/theatre/aagshuddhi-relevant-readaptation-millers-1953-classic/. Retrieved 2018-09-15.
 "Code Red to be staged in Kolkata after many months". The Times of India''. https://timesofindia.indiatimes.com/entertainment/bengali/theatre/code-red-to-be-staged-in-kolkata-after-many-months/articleshow/65149567.cms. Retrieved 2018-09-15.

Indian theatre managers and producers
1982 births
Living people
Male actors in Bengali cinema
Indian theatre directors